Londershausen House may refer to:

Gottlieb Londershausen House
Paul Londershausen House